The following is an alphabetical list of articles related to the U.S. state of Ohio.

0–9 

.oh.us – Internet second-level domain for the state of Ohio
17th state to join the United States of America

A
Adjacent states:

Agriculture in Ohio
Airports in Ohio
Amusement parks in Ohio
:Category:Amusement parks in Ohio
Appalachia
Arboreta in Ohio
commons:Category:Arboreta in Ohio
Archaeology of Ohio
:Category:Archaeological sites in Ohio
commons:Category:Archaeological sites in Ohio
Architecture of Ohio
Art museums and galleries in Ohio
commons:Category:Art museums and galleries in Ohio
Astronomical observatories in Ohio
commons:Category:Astronomical observatories in Ohio
Attorney General of the State of Ohio

B
Battle of Buffington Island
Battle of Chilicothe
Battle of the Cumberland Gap (1863)
Battle of Fort Stephenson
Battle of Lake Erie
Battle of Piqua
Battle of Salineville
Botanical gardens in Ohio
commons:Category:Botanical gardens in Ohio
Buildings and structures in Ohio
commons:Category:Buildings and structures in Ohio

C

Capital of the State of Ohio
Capitol of the State of Ohio
commons:Category:Ohio State Capitol
Caves of Ohio
commons:Category:Caves of Ohio*Census statistical areas of Ohio
Cedar Point
Charlotina
Carroll Meadows Golf Course
Chillicothe, capital of the Territory Northwest of the River Ohio 1800–1803, capital of the State of Ohio 1803–1810 and 1812–1816
Cincinnati, Ohio
Cities in Ohio
commons:Category:Cities in Ohio
Citizens for Sunshine
Civil War Ohio
Civil War generals from Ohio
Civil War units from Ohio
Cincinnati in the Civil War
Cleveland in the Civil War
Cleveland, Ohio
Climate of Ohio
:Category:Climate of Ohio
commons:Category:Climate of Ohio
Colleges and universities in Ohio
commons:Category:Universities and colleges in Ohio
Columbus, Ohio, state capital since 1816
Communications in Ohio
commons:Category:Communications in Ohio
Companies in Ohio
Congressional districts of Ohio
Constitution of the State of Ohio
Convention centers in Ohio
commons:Category:Convention centers in Ohio
Counties of the State of Ohio
commons:Category:Counties in Ohio
Covered bridges
Crescent Machine Company
Culture of Ohio
commons:Category:Ohio culture

D
Demographics of Ohio
Dayton, Ohio

E
Economy of Ohio
:Category:Economy of Ohio
commons:Category:Economy of Ohio
Education in Ohio
:Category:Education in Ohio
commons:Category:Education in Ohio
Elections in the State of Ohio
:Category:Ohio elections
commons:Category:Ohio elections
Electoral reform in Ohio
Environment of Ohio
commons:Category:Environment of Ohio

F

Festivals in Ohio
commons:Category:Festivals in Ohio
Flag of the State of Ohio
Forts in Ohio
:Category:Forts in Ohio
commons:Category:Forts in Ohio

G

Gardens in Ohio
commons:Category:Gardens in Ohio
Geography of Ohio
:Category:Geography of Ohio
commons:Category:Geography of Ohio
Geology of Ohio
commons:Category:Geology of Ohio
Ghost towns in Ohio
:Category:Ghost towns in Ohio
commons:Category:Ghost towns in Ohio
Golf clubs and courses in Ohio
Government of the State of Ohio  website
:Category:Government of Ohio
commons:Category:Government of Ohio
Governor of the State of Ohio
List of governors of Ohio
Great Seal of the State of Ohio

H
High schools of Ohio
Higher education in Ohio
Highway routes in Ohio
Hiking trails in Ohio
commons:Category:Hiking trails in Ohio
History of Ohio
Indigenous peoples
French colony of la Louisiane, 1699–1763
French and Indian War, 1754–1763
Treaty of Paris of 1763
British (though predominantly Francophone) Province of Quebec, (1763–1783)-1791
American Revolutionary War, 1775–1783
United States Declaration of Independence of 1776
Treaty of Paris of 1783
Unorganized territory of the United States, 1783–1787
Northwest Indian War, 1785–1795
Battle of Fallen Timbers, 1794
Treaty of Greenville, 1795
Territory Northwest of the River Ohio, 1787–1803
Connecticut Western Reserve, 1776–1800
State of Ohio, since 1803
War of 1812, 1812–1815
Battle of Lake Erie, 1813
Ohio in the American Civil War, 1861–1865
:Category:History of Ohio
commons:Category:History of Ohio
Hospitals in Ohio
House of Representatives of the State of Ohio

I
Images of Ohio
commons:Category:Ohio
Income inequality in Ohio
Interstate highway routes in Ohio
Islands of Ohio

J
 Jefferson County, Ohio
 Jefferson, Ohio
 Jefferson, Wayne County, Ohio
 Jeffersonville, Ohio
 Joshua Reed Giddings
 Joshua Reed Giddings Law Office

K
Kings Island

L
Lakes in Ohio
Lake Erie
:Category:Lakes of Ohio
commons:Category:Lakes of Ohio
Landmarks in Ohio
commons:Category:Landmarks in Ohio
Lieutenant Governor of the State of Ohio
Lists related to the State of Ohio:
List of airports in Ohio
List of census statistical areas in Ohio
List of cities in Ohio
List of colleges and universities in Ohio
List of counties in Ohio
List of covered bridges in Ohio
List of forts in Ohio
List of ghost towns in Ohio
List of governors of Ohio
List of high schools in Ohio
List of highway routes in Ohio
List of hospitals in Ohio
List of individuals executed in Ohio
List of Interstate highway routes in Ohio
List of islands of Ohio
List of lakes in Ohio
List of law enforcement agencies in Ohio
List of museums in Ohio
List of National Historic Landmarks in Ohio
List of newspapers in Ohio
List of people from Ohio
List of radio stations in Ohio
List of railroads in Ohio
List of Registered Historic Places in Ohio
List of rivers of Ohio
List of school districts in Ohio
List of state forests in Ohio
List of state highway routes in Ohio
List of state parks in Ohio
List of state prisons in Ohio
List of symbols of the State of Ohio
List of television stations in Ohio
List of United States congressional delegations from Ohio
List of United States congressional districts in Ohio
List of United States representatives from Ohio
List of United States senators from Ohio
List of U.S. highway routes in Ohio

M
Maps of Ohio
commons:Category:Maps of Ohio
Marietta, capital of the Territory Northwest of the River Ohio 1788–1800
Mass media in Ohio
Monuments and memorials in Ohio
commons:Category:Monuments and memorials in Ohio
Mountains of Ohio
commons:Category:Mountains of Ohio
Museums in Ohio
:Category:Museums in Ohio
commons:Category:Museums in Ohio
Music of Ohio
commons:Category:Music of Ohio
:Category:Musical groups from Ohio
:Category:Musicians from Ohio

N
National Forests of Ohio
commons:Category:National Forests of Ohio
Natural arches of Ohio
commons:Category:Natural arches of Ohio
Natural history of Ohio
commons:Category:Natural history of Ohio
Nature centers in Ohio
commons:Category:Nature centers in Ohio
Newspapers of Ohio
Northwest Territory

O
OH – United States Postal Service postal code for the State of Ohio
Ohio  website
:Category:Ohio
commons:Category:Ohio
commons:Category:Maps of Ohio
Ohio Alliance for Public Charter Schools
Ohio Automated Rx Reporting System
Ohio Business Development Coalition
Ohio Commission on Dispute Resolution and Conflict Management
Ohio estate tax
Ohio House (Philadelphia)
Ohio in the Civil War
Ohio National Organization for Women
Ohio Resource Center
Ohio River
Ohio State Highway Patrol
Ohio Statehouse
Ohio Youth Problems, Functioning and Satisfaction Scales (Ohio scales)
Outdoor sculptures in Ohio
commons:Category:Outdoor sculptures in Ohio

P
People from Ohio
:Category:People from Ohio
commons:Category:People from Ohio
:Category:People by city in Ohio
:Category:People by county in Ohio
:Category:People from Ohio by occupation*Politics of Ohio
Politics of Ohio
:Category:Politics of Ohio
commons:Category:Politics of Ohio
Protected areas of Ohio
:Category:Protected areas of Ohio

Q
 Quaker Oats Company

R
Radio stations in Ohio
Railroad museums in Ohio
commons:Category:Railroad museums in Ohio
Railroads in Ohio
Ravenna, Ohio
Registered historic places in Ohio
commons:Category:Registered Historic Places in Ohio
Religion in Ohio
commons:Category:Religion in Ohio
Rivers of Ohio
Ohio River
commons:Category:Rivers of Ohio
Roller coasters in Ohio
commons:Category:Roller coasters in Ohio

S
The Safety Council of Northwest Ohio
School districts of Ohio
Scouting in Ohio
Secretary of the State of Ohio
Senate of the State of Ohio
Settlements in Ohio
Cities in Ohio
Villages in Ohio
Townships in Ohio
Census Designated Places in Ohio
Other unincorporated communities in Ohio
List of ghost towns in Ohio
Siege of Fort Meigs
Ski areas and resorts in Ohio
commons:Category:Ski areas and resorts in Ohio
Sports in Ohio
:Category:Sports in Ohio
commons:Category:Sports in Ohio
:Category:Sports venues in Ohio
commons:Category:Sports venues in Ohio
State highway routes in Ohio
State of Ohio  website
Constitution of the State of Ohio
Government of the State of Ohio
:Category:Government of Ohio
commons:Category:Government of Ohio
Executive branch of the government of the State of Ohio
Governor of the State of Ohio
Legislative branch of the government of the State of Ohio
Legislature of the State of Ohio
Senate of the State of Ohio
House of Representatives of the State of Ohio
Judicial branch of the government of the State of Ohio
Supreme Court of the State of Ohio
State parks of Ohio
commons:Category:State parks of Ohio
State prisons of Ohio
Structures in Ohio
commons:Category:Buildings and structures in Ohio
Supreme Court of the State of Ohio
Symbols of the State of Ohio
:Category:Symbols of Ohio
commons:Category:Symbols of Ohio

T
Telecommunications in Ohio
commons:Category:Communications in Ohio
Telephone area codes in Ohio
Television shows set in Ohio
Television stations in Ohio
Territory Northwest of the River Ohio
Theatres in Ohio
commons:Category:Theatres in Ohio
Tourism in Ohio  website
commons:Category:Tourism in Ohio
Transportation in Ohio
:Category:Transportation in Ohio
commons:Category:Transport in Ohio
Treasurer of the State of Ohio
Tri-Rivers Educational Computer Association

U
United States of America
States of the United States of America
United States census statistical areas of Ohio
United States congressional delegations from Ohio
United States congressional districts in Ohio
United States Court of Appeals for the Sixth Circuit
United States District Court for the Northern District of Ohio
United States District Court for the Southern District of Ohio
United States representatives from Ohio
United States senators from Ohio
Universities and colleges in Ohio
commons:Category:Universities and colleges in Ohio
U.S. highway routes in Ohio
US-OH – ISO 3166-2:US region code for the State of Ohio

V
Vienna Center, Ohio

W
Water parks in Ohio
Wikimedia
Wikimedia Commons:Category:Ohio
commons:Category:Maps of Ohio
Wikinews:Category:Ohio
Wikinews:Portal:Ohio
Wikipedia Category:Ohio
Wikipedia Portal:Ohio
Wikipedia:WikiProject Ohio
:Category:WikiProject Ohio articles
:Category:WikiProject Ohio participants
Wind power in Ohio

X
 Xavier University

Y
 Yellow Creek, Ohio
 Yellow Creek Township, Columbiana County, Ohio
 Youngstown, Ohio

Z
Zanesville, Ohio, state capital 1810–1812
Zoos in Ohio
commons:Category:Zoos in Ohio

See also

Topic overview:
Ohio
Outline of Ohio

Ohio
 
Ohio